Caelostomus basilewskyi is a species of ground beetle in the subfamily Pterostichinae. It was first described by Stefano Ludovico Straneo in 1948.

References

Caelostomus
Beetles described in 1948